(often stylized as SAGA PLANETS), is a Japanese adult visual novel brand and a formerly subsidiary of Visual Art's. Their debut title, Mukuro ~Mesu o Nerau Agito~, was released in 1998 and their most recent work, AMBITIOUS MISSION, was released in 2022. Among Saga Planets' most notable releases is the : Coming x Humming!! (representing spring), Natsuyume Nagisa (representing summer), Kisaragi Gold ★ Star (representing autumn), and Hatsuyuki Sakura (representing winter).

Releases

Awards

Natsuyume Nagisa
2009 Getchu Bishoujo Game Awards
12th place: Overall
8th place: Scenario
Kisaragi Gold ★ Star
2010 Getchu Bishoujo Game Awards
15th place: Overall
7th place: Music
12th place: Opening Movie
12th place: Character (Haotone Tsubasa)
Hatsuyuki Sakura
2012 Getchu Bishoujo Game Awards
1st place: Overall
1st place: Scenario
1st place: Music
2nd place: Character (Tamaki Sakura)
7th place: Character (Kozaki Aya)
7th place: Opening Movie
11th place: Art
20th place: Game Engine
Karumaruka ＊ Circle
2013 Getchu Bishoujo Game Awards
17th place: Overall
9th place: Art
18th place: Character (Asahina Shin)
Hanasaki Work Spring!
2015 Getchu Bishoujo Game Awards
9th place: Overall
8th place: Art
2nd place: Music
7th place: Opening Movie
3rd place: Character (Hanasaki Nonoka)
6th place: Character (Shiranui Inori)
8th place: Character (Kuon Ayano)
11th place: Character (Soramori Wakaba)
2015 Moe Game Awards
3rd place: Overall
Best Theme Song

References

External links
Saga Planets' official website 

"サガプラネッツ" ErogameScape 

Amusement companies of Japan
Mass media in Osaka
Privately held companies of Japan
Video game companies of Japan
Video game companies established in 1998
Japanese companies established in 1998
Video game development companies